M. A. Maleque (born 1 June 1953) is a Bangladesh Awami League politician and the former Member of Parliament from Dhaka-20.

Career
Maleque was elected to Parliament on 5 January 2014 from Dhaka-20 as a candidate of Bangladesh Awami League. In June 2017, he supported the Hindu community Rath Mela in Dhamrai. The mela of the Hindu community was being opposed by Dhamrai municipal mayor Golam Kabir. In 2022, he has been elected as president of Dhamrai upazila unit of Awami League.

References

Awami League politicians
Living people
1953 births
10th Jatiya Sangsad members